The A. M. "Mac" Stringfellow Unit (previously Ramsey II Unit) is a Texas Department of Criminal Justice prison located in unincorporated Brazoria County, Texas, with a Rosharon, Texas postal address it is not inside the Rosharon census-designated place. The unit is co-located with the Ramsey Unit and the Terrell Unit on a  plot of land.

History
The unit opened in July 1908. The Ramsey Prison Farm consisted of five former plantations. In 1963, before racial desegregation occurred, the Ramsey II Unit housed African-American prisoners over the age of 25.

In 2006, the Ramsey II facility was renamed in honor of Alfred McIntyre "Mac" Stringfellow, a former TDCJ board chairman.  Stringfellow served from January 2000 to February 2003.

Operations
The Stringfellow Unit is within the attendance zone of the Alvin Community College. Stringfellow was included through H.B. No. 2744, filed on March 6, 2007.

References

External links

 "Stringfellow Unit." Texas Department of Criminal Justice.
 Map of Stringfellow Unit: Texas Tribune

Prisons in Brazoria County, Texas
1908 establishments in Texas
Buildings and structures in Brazoria County, Texas